Semra Dinçer (25 July 1965 – 1 November 2021) was a Turkish actress.

Dinçer was born in 1965, in Ankara. Despite not receiving a formal education in acting, she started her career in 1984 with a leading role in TRT series Köşe Dönücü. She is best known for her role in the series Kuzey Güney as Handan Tekinoğlu. She also served as a scriptwriter in seven movies and appeared in more than 42 films and TV series.

Dinçer died on 1 November 2021, after suffering from lung cancer for two years. Her body was buried in the Osmanağa Village Cemetery in Ankara's Sincan district.

Filmography

References

External links 
 
 

1965 births
2021 deaths
Turkish film actresses
Turkish television actresses
Actresses from Ankara
Deaths from lung cancer in Turkey